Safri Duo is a Danish electronic percussion duo composed of Uffe Savery (born 5 April 1966) and Morten Friis (born 21 August 1968). Initially classically oriented, they later made a track mixing both tribal sound and modern electronica. Released in 2000, "Played-A-Live (The Bongo Song)", became one of the most popular songs in Europe in 2001. The single and subsequent album, Episode II each sold one million units worldwide, making Safri Duo the most internationally successful Danish act since Aqua.

History

Early years
Uffe Savery and Morten Friis met in 1977 while attending the Tivoli Garden Boys' Guard, and later, during their time at the Royal Danish Conservatory of Music, formed an experimental duo, called Safri Duo, whose name originated from the first letters of their respective surnames. Several albums were recorded and released through Chandos Records, on which the duo performed pieces by both famous classical (e.g. Bach, Mendelssohn, Ravel, whose works were arranged by Savery and Friis for two marimbas, or for marimba and vibraphone) and contemporary composers (a.o. Reich, Nørgård, Ter Veldhuis). Their performances of, especially, Ter Veldhuis' Goldrush, Ravel's Alborada del gracioso and Anders Koppel's Toccata for vibraphone and marimba are often labelled as small milestones by fellow percussionists, as well as other musicians or people related to the world of classical music.

Mainstream success
Earlier in 2000, a track named "The Bongo Song" started appearing on clubs' playlists. Produced by Michael Parsberg, it soon got airtime on MTV Europe. The mix between tribal drums over trance proved to be a success, and it ended the year as one of the best selling singles in Europe in 2000 as well as featuring prominently in the opening ceremony of the 2000 Summer Olympics in Sydney. This resulted in Safri Duo guesting along with Danish pop group Aqua during the interval of the Eurovision Song Contest 2001 held in Copenhagen.  "The Bongo Song" was featured prominently during the 2002 Commonwealth Games held in Manchester, England as well as the soundtrack of FIFA Football 2003. The album, named Episode II, hit the market on 4 June 2001, nine tracks long, all featured the same  percussion-electronica combination, except "Adagio" that kept the former classic line of the duo. A reissue added a second remix-only CD and the single "Sweet Freedom" recorded with Michael McDonald was released on 30 September 2002 (also "Everything" appeared in this CD Single as a B-Side). Two more tracks from Episode II were released as singles, "Samb-Adagio" and "Baya Baya". The Bongo Song became the anthem of the world-famous Coco Bongo super club in Cancún, where it is the party opening song every night.

3.0
In 2003 the new album 3.0 was released. It featured Clark Anderson as vocalist on several of the tracks, including "All the People in the World", "Agogo Mosse" and "Laarbasses". The single "Rise" became a huge success and later they released a new version called "Rise (Leave Me Alone)" which featured Clark Anderson on vocals. In 2004 they released a remix album of 3.0 called 3.5 – International Version. It included the new version of "Rise" and several other tracks with Clark Anderson as vocalist and remixes of the already known tracks. They also played in the concert of Jean Michel Jarre (AERO Concert) on his famous track Rendez vous 4.

Origins
Safri Duo's latest album Origins was released on 17 November 2008.

Discography

Studio albums

Compilation albums
 Greatest Hits (2010)

Singles

References

External links
 

Danish dance music groups
Electronic music duos
Danish electronic music groups
MTV Europe Music Award winners